The 2012 Campeonato Nacional Clausura Petrobras was the 91st season of the Chilean Primera División. The champions was Huachipato which won its 2nd league title, 38 years after winning their first one.

Regular season

Standings

Results

Playoff stage

Quarterfinals

Colo-Colo won 6–5 on aggregate.

Unión Española won 4–1 on aggregate.

Huachipato won 3–2 on aggregate.

Rangers won 2–0 on aggregate.

Semifinals

Unión Española won 5–1 on aggregate.

Huachipato won 2–1 on aggregate.

Finals

4–4 on aggregate. Huachipato won 3–2 on penalties.

Aggregate table

Relegation/promotion playoffs

Everton won 4–1 on aggregate and is promoted to Primera División. Universidad de Concepción is relegated to Primera B.

Cobresal won 4–3 on aggregate and therefore both clubs remain in their respective leagues.

References

External links
ANFP 
2012 Torneo Clausura at Soccerway
Season regulations 

Primera División de Chile seasons
Chile
Prim